Mirar Kola (also Romanized as Mīrar Kolā; also known as Mīzār Kolā) is a village in Lafur Rural District, North Savadkuh County, Mazandaran Province, Iran. At the 2006 census, its population was 92, in 40 families.

References 

Populated places in Savadkuh County